Analecta Hermeneutica is the annual refereed journal of the International Institute for Hermeneutics (IIH) which publishes contributions in all hermeneutically related fields in English, German, French, Italian, and Spanish with a particular focus on philosophy, theology, and comparative literature. Its editor-in-chief is Andrzej Wierciński and its editor is S.J. McGrath. Analecta Hermeneutica is hosted by the Department of Philosophy at Memorial University of Newfoundland.

References

External links 
 

Multilingual journals
Philosophy journals
Open access journals
Publications established in 2009
Annual journals
Contemporary philosophical literature
Hermeneutics
Multidisciplinary humanities journals